The Reichstag deputies of the Kingdom of Saxony were elected by male suffrage over the age of 25 across the Kingdom of Saxony from 1867 until the abolition of the Kingdom in 1918.

Following the North German Confederation Treaty the Kingdom of Saxony entered the North German Confederation in 1866. As a consequence, the Kingdom returned Deputies to the Reichstag. After the founding of the German Empire on 18 January 1871, the deputies were returned to the Reichstag of the German Empire. Following this Saxony participated in Reichstag elections from February 1867. Zittau returned a series of Reichstag Deputies until 1919 when the existing constituencies were scrapped.

Reichstag of the North German Federation

Reichstag of the German Empire

3 March, 1871: 1st Reichstag of the German Empire
The Reichstag election of 3 March, 1871 was the election of the members of the 1st Reichstag of the German Empire.

References

Kingdom of Saxony
Reichstag deputies of the Kingdom of Saxony
Reichstag deputies of the Kingdom of Saxony
Reichstag deputies of the Kingdom of Saxony
Reichstag deputies of the Kingdom of Saxony